Canoeing is an African Games event at its inaugural edition in 2011 in Maputo, Mozambique.

Editions

Medal table

External links

 
Sports at the African Games
All-Africa Games